The El Alami Group is a group founded by Abdelaziz El Alami Hassani (headquartered in Tangier).
Today, the group is headed by Abdelhouahed El Alami(a lawyer by profession) and CEO Mourad El Bied. The group is concentrated primarily on the building industry.

After two years of stagnation in 2006/2007, the group gradually leaving his business (sale of Jacob Delafon, abandoning Afric Industry, ...) to get started on building projects and hoteliers.

 It was in 1950 that Abdelaziz El Alami Hassani laid the foundation of the group. Since then, the holding company is the leader in all markets where it operates. In 2001, it received the 2nd place trophy for National Quality.

Activities
Aluminium du Maroc
Real Estate Development
Industube
SNR
Structal
Afric industrie

External links
aluminium of morocco

Real estate companies of Morocco
Organizations based in Tangier
Construction and civil engineering companies of Morocco